The internal urethral orifice is the opening of the urinary bladder into the urethra. It is placed at the apex of the trigonum vesicae, in the most dependent part of the bladder, and is usually somewhat crescent-shaped; the mucous membrane immediately behind it presents a slight elevation in males, the uvula vesicae, caused by the middle lobe of the prostate.

See also
 Internal sphincter muscle of urethra

References

External links
  - "The Male Pelvis: The Urethra"

Urinary system
Urethra